The University of Wollongong Titans (or UOW Titans) is an Australian rugby league football team based in Wollongong. The club are a part of Country Rugby League and competes in the Illawarra Rugby League premiership. The club plays out of University Oval, Wollongong. The Titans wear red, navy and white jerseys. An earlier team from the University of Wollongong were nicknamed the "Books".

See also
 University of Wollongong

References

External links
 
 Country Rugby League Homepage
 Illawarra Rugby League Homepage

Rugby league teams in Wollongong
University of Wollongong
University and college sports clubs in Australia
University and college rugby league clubs